Drepana dispilata is a moth in the family Drepanidae. It was described by Warren in 1922. It is found in northern India, Sikkim, northern Myanmar and the Chinese provinces of Sichuan, Yunnan and Shaanxi.

Subspecies
Drepana dispilata dispilata (northern India, Sikkim, northern Myanmar)
Drepana dispilata grisearipennis Strand, 1911 (China: Sichuan)
Drepana dispilata rufata Watson, 1968 (China: Yunnan, Shaanxi)

References

Moths described in 1922
Drepaninae